Jowzjan University is located in  Jowzjan province, northern Afghanistan. Founded in 2002, Jawzjan University JU is a non-profit public higher-education University which is  located in the Beautiful city of Sheberghan, Jowzjan.  JU also provides several academic degrees which makes it one of the prestigious university in Afghanistan and a range of student around 7000 which has a key role contribution in academic research in Afghanistan.

Faculties of Jowzjan University 

Faculty of Construction

Faculty of Chemistry Technology

Faculty of Education Science

Faculty of Economic Studies

Faculty of Law

Faculty of social Sciences

Faculty of Turkish Literature

See also 
List of universities in Afghanistan

References

Universities in Afghanistan
University